"I Got You" is the third single by American singer, Nick Carter. It was written by Max Martin and Rami Yacoub for Carter's first studio album, Now or Never. "I Got You" was released on February 14, 2003, was a major hit in Europe, Southeast Asia and Australia.

Formats and track listings

 UK CD1
 "I Got You" (Album Version) - 3:57
 "Rockstar Baby" - 3:14

 UK CD2
 "I Got You" (Album Version) - 3:57
 "Is It Saturday Yet?" - 3:13
 "Rockstar Baby" - 3:14
 "I Got You" (Enhanced Video) - 3:55

Charts

References

External links
  at Vevo

2003 singles
Nick Carter (musician) songs
Songs written by Max Martin
Songs written by Rami Yacoub
2002 songs
Jive Records singles